Janina Fetlińska (14 June 1952 in Tuligłowy – 10 April 2010) was a member of the Polish Senate representing the Law and Justice party, a nurse.

She was listed on the flight manifest of the Tupolev Tu-154 of the 36th Special Aviation Regiment carrying the President of Poland Lech Kaczyński which crashed near Smolensk-North airport near Pechersk near Smolensk, Russia, on 10 April 2010, killing all aboard.

On 16 April 2010 she was posthumously awarded the Commander's Cross of the Order of Polonia Restituta. On April 17, 2010 she received the Honorary Cross of the Scouting Association of the Republic.

References

1952 births
2010 deaths
Victims of the Smolensk air disaster
Women members of the Senate of Poland
Commanders of the Order of Polonia Restituta
Members of the Senate of Poland 2007–2011
Polish Scouts and Guides
21st-century Polish women politicians
Law and Justice politicians